In computing, Hazelcast IMDG is an open source in-memory data grid based on Java. It is also the name of the company developing the product. The Hazelcast company is funded by venture capital and headquartered in Palo Alto, California.

In a Hazelcast grid, data is evenly distributed among the nodes of a computer cluster, allowing for horizontal scaling of processing and available storage. Backups are also distributed among nodes to protect against failure of any single node. Hazelcast provides central, predictable scaling of applications through in-memory access to frequently used data and across an elastically scalable data grid. These techniques reduce the query load on databases and improve speed.

Hazelcast can run on-premises, in the cloud (Amazon Web Services, Microsoft Azure, Cloud Foundry, OpenShift), virtually (VMware), and in Docker containers. Hazelcast offers technology integrations for multiple cloud configuration and deployment technologies, including Apache jclouds, Consul, etcd, Eureka, Kubernetes, and Zookeeper. The Hazelcast Cloud Discovery Service Provider Interface (SPI) enables cloud-based or on-premises nodes to auto-discover each other.

The Hazelcast platform can manage memory for many different types of applications. It offers an Open Binary Client Protocol to support APIs for any binary programming language. The Hazelcast and open source community members have created client APIs for programming languages that include Java, .NET, C++, Python, Node.js and Go.

Usage
Typical use-cases for Hazelcast include:
 Application scaling
 Cache-as-a-service
 Cross-JVM communication and shared storage
 Distributed cache, often in front of a database
 In-memory processing and Analytics
 In-memory computing
 Internet of Things infrastructure
 Key-value database
 Memcached alternative with a protocol compatible interface
 Microservices infrastructure
 NoSQL data store
 Spring Cache
 Web Session clustering

Vert.x utilizes it for shared storage.

Hazelcast is also used in academia and research as a framework for distributed execution and storage.

 Cloud2Sim leverages Hazelcast as a distributed execution framework for CloudSim cloud simulations.

 ElastiCon distributed SDN controller uses Hazelcast as its distributed data store.

 ∂u∂u exploits Hazelcast as its distributed execution framework for near duplicate detection in enterprise data solutions.

See also
 Complex event processing
 Distributed data store
 Distributed transaction processing
 Infinispan
 Oracle Coherence
 Ehcache
 Couchbase Server
 Apache Ignite
 Redis

References

External links
 
 

Transaction processing
Storage software
Free software